The Ramon Jaramillo House and Barn, on Encenada Rd. in Encenada, New Mexico, was listed on the National Register of Historic Places in 1986.

The house is stucco covered and had a corrugated roof, with cutout scroll ornamentation in its gables, and was built in 1887.

The main barn is built of hewn horizontal logs with dovetail notching, and was built in the 1880s.  It has a small shed attached which was added in the 1920s.

References

		
National Register of Historic Places in Rio Arriba County, New Mexico
Houses completed in 1887